Practice What You Preach is the third studio album by American thrash metal band Testament, released in August 1989 via Atlantic/Megaforce. Propelled by the singles "Greenhouse Effect", "The Ballad" and the title track "Practice What You Preach", this album was a major breakthrough for Testament, achieving near gold status and becoming the band's first album to enter the Top 100 on the Billboard 200 chart.

Background
While retaining the thrash metal sound of its predecessors, Practice What You Preach saw Testament draw influences from numerous genres such as traditional heavy metal, jazz fusion and progressive/technical metal, and its lyrical themes are more about politics and society than the occult themes of the band's previous two albums—these changes had alienated some early fans of Testament. Songs like the title track and "Blessed in Contempt" relate to religion, while "Greenhouse Effect" is a political song about an "environmental holocaust", "Sins of Omission" deals with suicide prevention, and "The Ballad" is about a break up and recovery.

Reportedly recorded live in the studio, this was the band's last album to be produced by Alex Perialas, and the production values can be loosely compared to Flotsam and Jetsam's 1990 album When the Storm Comes Down, which was also produced by Perialas and recorded shortly after the release of Practice What You Preach.

Besides the title track, which has been a staple of the band's concert setlists for more than three decades, Testament rarely plays any songs from Practice What You Preach anymore. Out of the album's ten songs, "Confusion Fusion" is the only one that has never been performed in concert. "Envy Life" and "Sins of Omission" had been played live again occasionally in the 2000s and 2010s. The others however, including "Perilous Nation" (save for one show in New York in 2008), "Time Is Coming", "Blessed in Contempt", "Greenhouse Effect", "The Ballad" and "Nightmare (Coming Back to You)", have not been included in performances since the early 1990s.

Reception

Reviews for Practice What You Preach have generally been favorable. Allmusic's Alex Henderson awards it three stars out of five, and about the album, he says that Testament placed "more emphasis on subjects like freedom of choice, political corruption, hypocrisy, and the effects of greed and avarice" and that "its musical approach is much the same -- under the direction of metal producer Alex Perialas."

Practice What You Preach was Testament's first record to enter the Top 100 on the Billboard 200 album charts, peaking at number 77 and staying on the chart for twelve weeks. The title track of Practice What You Preach was a moderate mainstream rock hit, as were "The Ballad" and "Greenhouse Effect". These songs received considerable airplay from album-oriented rock radio stations, while its music videos found significant rotation on MTV's Headbangers Ball. By June 1992, Practice What You Preach had sold over 450,000 copies in the United States.

The album has been included in various best-of lists in the years since its release, including Guitar Worlds "The Top 10 Shred Albums of the Eighties" in 1999; the magazine's editor Mordechai Kleidermacher wrote, "With their fast-and-chunky riffs and scorched-earth solos, Testament's Alex Skolnick and Eric Peterson show the world what true thrash-and-burn guitar terror is all about. Combining the sophistication of a progressive guy with the ferocity of a metal guy, Skolnick's guitar weeps, wails, sings, roars and rocks."

Touring and promotion
Testament toured for less than a year to promote Practice What You Preach. They embarked on a two-month U.S. tour from October to December 1989 with Annihilator and Wrathchild America (both of whom had just released their respective debut albums Alice in Hell and Climbin' the Walls), and wrapped the year up with two shows in California with Nuclear Assault and Voivod. The second leg of the Practice What You Preach tour began in January 1990, when Testament was touring Europe with Mortal Sin and Xentrix. Following their first visit to Japan that February, Testament embarked on a two-month U.S. tour with Savatage which featured support from Nuclear Assault, Dead Horse, and Dark Angel. After the Practice What You Preach tour came to an end in May 1990, Testament began work on their fourth studio album Souls of Black.

Track listing

Personnel
Testament
 Chuck Billy – vocals
 Eric Peterson – guitars
 Alex Skolnick – guitars
 Greg Christian – bass
 Louie Clemente – drums

Additional personnel
 Mark Walters – backing vocals
 Bogdan Jablonski – backing vocals
 Willy Lang – backing vocals
 Elliot Cahn – backing vocals
 William Benson – cover art

Charts

References

Testament (band) albums
1989 albums
Atlantic Records albums
Albums produced by Alex Perialas
Megaforce Records albums
Albums about climate change